The Mayor of the City of Stockton is the official head and chief executive officer of Stockton, California. The mayor is elected for a four-year term and limited to serving no more than two terms. Under the California Constitution, all judicial, school, county, and city offices, including those of chartered cities, are nonpartisan. Kevin Lincoln is the city's 80th and current mayor, having assumed office on January 1, 2021.

List of mayors
As of 2021, 80 individuals have served as Stockton's mayor since its incorporation as a city in California. Ten mayors have served non consecutive terms, the first being E.S. Holden and the most recent being Arnold Rue. The mayor is chosen every four years in a municipal vote. Prior to 1992, the mayor was selected from the City Council.

References

Stockton
Stockton, California